Thirukannapuram is a  village in the Indian state of Tamil Nadu, Nagapattinam District. A popular Perumal temple (Neelmegha Perumal) is there. During the tamil month of Masi (mid of February to March) magam  festivel conducted greatly.

Temples 
 Neelamegha Perumal Temple (Divya Desams)
 Ramanadheeswarar Temple (Paadal Petra Sthalam)

References

External links 
 History - Thirukannapuram
 Thirukkannapurum Location in Wikimapia

Villages in Nagapattinam district